BPHC can refer to:
Bureau of Primary Health Care
Boston Public Health Commission
BITS-Pilani Hyderabad Campus